Shark River is a 1953 American Florida Western adventure film directed by John Rawlins and written by Louis Lantz and Lewis Meltzer. It stars Steve Cochran, Carole Mathews, Warren Stevens, Robert Cunningham, Ruth Foreman, Spencer Fox and Bill Piper, and was released on November 13, 1953, by United Artists.

Plot

Cast 
Steve Cochran as Dan Webley
Carole Mathews as Jane Daughterty
Warren Stevens as Clay Webley
Robert Cunningham as Curtis Parker
Ruth Foreman as Mrs. Daughterty
Spencer Fox as Johnny Daughterty
Bill Piper as Sheriff

References

External links 
 

1953 films
1950s English-language films
United Artists films
American adventure films
1953 adventure films
Films directed by John Rawlins
1950s American films